Sport in Montenegro revolves mostly around team sports, such as football, basketball, handball, and volleyball. Other sports involved are boxing, tennis, swimming, judo, karate, athletics, table tennis, and chess.

Water polo is the most popular sport in Montenegro, and is considered the national sport. Montenegro men's national water polo team is one of the top ranked teams in the world, winning the gold medal at the 2008 Men's European Water Polo Championship in Málaga, Spain, and winning the gold medal at the 2009 FINA Men's Water Polo World League, which was held in the Montenegrin capital, Podgorica. The Montenegrin team PVK Primorac from Kotor became a champion of Europe at the LEN Euroleague 2009 in Rijeka, Croatia.

Football is the second most popular sport in Montenegro. Notable football players from Montenegro are Dejan Savićević, Predrag Mijatović, Mirko Vučinić, Stefan Savić and Stevan Jovetić. Montenegrin national football team, founded in 2006, played in playoffs for UEFA Euro 2012, which is the biggest success in the history of the national team.

The Montenegro national basketball team is also known for good performances and had won a lot of medals in the past as part of the Yugoslavia national basketball team. In 2006, the Basketball Federation of Montenegro along with this team joined the International Basketball Federation (FIBA) on its own, following the Independence of Montenegro. Montenegro participated on two Eurobaskets until now.

Among women's sports, the national handball team is the most successful, having won the 2012 European Championship and finishing as runners-up at the 2012 Summer Olympics. ŽRK Budućnost Podgorica won two times EHF Champions League.

National competitions

Leagues and Cups
Out of all the leagues and other national competitions in Montenegro, the most popular are football, basketball, handball, volleyball and water polo. Before independence, Montenegrin clubs played in the competitions of SFR Yugoslavia, FR Yugoslavia and Serbia and Montenegro. After 2006, Montenegrin sports federations founded their own national leagues and cups.

At the end of every season, champions and Cup winners from Montenegrin national competitions play in European competitions. Many of them have performed well in European cups, particularly in basketball, women's handball, water polo and volleyball. Before independence, Montenegrin clubs won titles in Yugoslavian competitions, and especially successful clubs included KK Budućnost Podgorica, ŽRK Budućnost Podgorica, RK Lovćen and PVK Jadran.

Below is a list of all leagues and cups in Montenegro.

Football

Men
The most successful clubs in domestic Montenegrin football competitions are FK Budućnost Podgorica and FK Sutjeska Nikšić, each with four Montenegrin First League titles, however Budućnost have won more Montenegrin Cups. (See: List of Montenegrin First League champions and List of Montenegrin Cup winners)

Women
Women's football is the newest of all team sports in Montenegro. The first national competition was held in 2008, and the most successful club is ŽFK Ekonomist Nikšić with five league titles and one cup.(See: List of Montenegrin Women's League champions and Montenegrin Women's Cup winners)

Water polo
During the era of SFR Yugoslavia, the first national titles won by Montenegrin clubs were in water polo. There are three extremely successful water polo clubs from Montenegro - PVK Jadran Herceg Novi, VK Primorac Kotor and VK Budva. All of those clubs are holders of both national trophies - from Yugoslavian and from Montenegrin competitions. As well as that, VK Primorac have been a champion of Europe. (See: List of Montenegrin First League of Water Polo champions and List of Montenegrin Water Polo Cup winners)

Handball

Men
RK Lovćen Cetinje is the most successful Montenegrin men's handball club with titles from the former Yugoslavia to their name. As well as them, six other clubs have won the national trophies since 2006. (See: List of Montenegrin Handball First League champions and List of Montenegrin Men's Handball Cup winners)

Women
The most successful Montenegrin club is ŽRK Budućnost Podgorica. It's one of two clubs from Montenegro that have won European competitions in team sports (twice), and the only club to have won Montenegrin women's handball league titles. ŽRK Budućnost is the all-time most successful club in SFR Yugoslavia, FR Yugoslavia and Montenegro. (See: List of Montenegrin Women's Handball League champions and List of Montenegrin Women's Handball Cup winners)

Basketball

Men
Among Montenegrin basketball clubs, the most successful is KK Budućnost Podgorica, who have many titles of Yugoslavia and Montenegro, with a few successful seasons in FIBA and ULEB Euroleague. KK Budućnost have won every league title ever since Montenegrin independence and three titles in the former Yugoslavia. KK Sutjeska Nikšić have won one cup, whilst all the others were won by KK Budućnost. (See: List of Prva A Liga champions and List of Montenegrin Basketball Cup winners)

Women
The most successful women's basketball club is ŽKK Budućnost Podgorica, who are the only Montenegrin team with titles from the Yugoslav League. As well as Budućnost, other successful teams are ŽKK Jedinstvo Bijelo Polje. (See: List of Montenegrin Women's Basketball League champions and List of Montenegrin Women's Basketball Cup winners)

Volleyball

Men
OK Budvanska Rivijera Budva and OK Budućnost were two most successful Montenegrin volleyball clubs in former Yugoslav competitions. Since 2006, those two teams have dominated in Montenegrin competitions too, but the team with the most trophies out of the two is Budvanska Rivijera. (See: List of Montenegrin Volleyball League champions and List of Montenegrin volleyball Cup winners)

Women
Among Montenegrin women's volleyball clubs, four have won at least one national trophy. The most successful club is ŽOK Luka Bar, who was the only Montenegrin club that participated in Yugoslav elite competitions, too. (See: List of Montenegrin Women's Volleyball League champions and List of Montenegrin Women's Volleyball Cup winners)

Main rivalries and derbies
In every sport, there is one big rivalry in Montenegro. The biggest rivalry across any sport is the football rivalry between FK Budućnost Podgorica and FK Sutjeska Nikšić, known as the Montenegrin Derby. Other traditional football rivalries are between FK Budućnost and FK Lovćen Cetinje, because the two clubs have been playing games against each other since the 1920s. Between 2000 and 2009, there was a huge interest for the Podgorica rivalry between FK Budućnost and FK Zeta, and between 2008 and 2014 there was another important local derby in the Montenegrin First League, between two teams from Nikšić - FK Sutjeska and FK Čelik Nikšić. Since independence in 2006, one of the most important games are matches between FK Budućnost and FK Rudar Pljevlja.

The main derby in basketball is between KK Budućnost Podgorica and KK Sutjeska Nikšić. During the 90's, there was another Montenegrin basketball derby between KK Budućnost and KK Lovćen Cetinje.

The main handball derby in Montenegro is between RK Lovćen Cetinje and RK Berane. There is also a rivalry between RK Lovćen and RK Budućnost Podgorica.

Since the 90's, OK Budućnost Podgorica and OK Budvanska Rivijera Budva have been playing the Montenegrin volleyball derby. Around the turn of the century in 2001, a derby game in Podgorica recorded the highest all-time attendance in the Yugoslav volleyball league (7,500).

The main Montenegrin water polo derby is between VK Primorac Kotor and PVK Jadran Herceg Novi.

Montenegrin clubs in European and ragional competitions
During the every season, Montenegrin clubs in every team-sport are participating in European competitions. Most successful were teams in women's handball and men's water polo, who won the titles of Champion of Europe. Except that sports, Montenegrin teams are playing in European competitions in football (men, women), handball, basketball (men, women), volleyball (men, women) and similar sports.

At the beginning of the 21st century, on the territory of former Yugoslavia started process of founding regional sport leagues. Montenegrin clubs were among the founders of all regional competitions, and today they are participating in ABA League, WABA League, SEHA League, Women's Regional Handball League and Adriatic Water Polo League. An exception is Balkans Cup in football, a regional tournament that was held earlier—between the 1960s and 90s.

Notable results
Among the notable results and successes of Montenegrin clubs in European competitions are following seasons;

Football

Men's competitions

During the history, Montenegrin football clubs played in three different UEFA competitions for clubs - UEFA Champions League, UEFA Europe League (formerly UEFA Cup) and Intertoto Cup. Champions of Montenegro never played in the group-phase of UEFA Champions League, and most successful in the qualifiers was FK Zeta Golubovci at season 2007–08. Best performances in UEFA Europe League had FK Zeta who played in the playoffs, and FK Mladost Podgorica and FK Budućnost, which played in Round 3. Most successful in Intertoto Cup was FK Budućnost Podgorica.

Balkans Cup is a former regional football competition (1960–1994) in which Montenegrin clubs participated as a representatives of SFR Yugoslavia. Teams from Montenegro that played in Balkans Cup were FK Budućnost Podgorica and FK Sutjeska Nikšić. Biggest success made FK Budućnost, who played in the final 1991, after eliminated Galatasaray SK.

Women's competitions

Since the season 2012–13, champion of Montenegrin Women's League is playing in the UEFA Women's Champions League. In the period 2012–2015, the only Montenegrin representative was ŽFK Ekonomist. On season 2016–17, for the first time, Montenegro was represented in UEFA Champions League by ŽFK Breznica.

Water polo

Montenegrin water polo clubs are participating in the LEN competitions since the season 1986–97. First team that ever competed at the European cups was VK Primorac Kotor. Except them, in LEN competitions played also PVK Jadran Herceg Novi, VK Budva, VA Cattaro Kotor and PVK Val Prčanj. Biggest success in the history of Montenegrin waterpolo made VK Primorac, who won the title in LEN Champions League 2009. Except them, another Montenegrin holder of European trophy is VA Cattaro.

Clubs from Montenegro were among the founders of Adriatic Water Polo League, which is established at 2008. Since its first season, Montenegrin sides were among the most successful participants of regional competition, and PVK Jadran Herceg Novi won two titles. Othed clubs from Montenegro that participated in Adriatic League are VK Primorac Kotor, VK Budva and VA Cattaro Kotor.

Handball

Men's competitions

Montenegrin men's handball clubs are participating in the EHF competitions since the season 1995/96. First team that ever competed at the European cups was Mornar Bar and most successful Montenegrin represent in the European competitions is Lovćen Cetinje. The other Montenegrin clubs that competed at the EHF competitions are Berane, Rudar Pljevlja, Budućnost Podgorica, Sutjeska Nikšić, Mojkovac and Budvanska rivijera Budva. The greatest result in the European cups made RK Lovćen during the season 2000/01. As a champion of FR Yugoslavia, Lovćen won fifth place in the EHF Champions League.

Southeastern European Handball Association League, or SEHA League is founded at 2011, and Montenegrin clubs were part of it since first season. Most successful Montenegrin representative in regional league was RK Lovćen.

Women's competitions

Montenegrin women's handball clubs are participating in the EHF competitions since the season 1984/85. Montenegrin side ŽRK Budućnost Podgorica was extremely successful in the European Cups and today is among the best and most-trophied European and global women's handball teams. They are most successful Montenegrin sports team in European Cups, too. ŽRK Budućnost won six European titles. Except ŽRK Budućnost, until today, representatives of Montenegro in women's EHF competitions were ŽRK Biseri Pljevlja, ŽRK Danilovgrad, ŽRK Nikšić and ŽRK Petrol Bonus Podgorica.

Women Regional Handball League (WRHL) is founded in 2009, and Montenegrin clubs are participating from its inaugural season. As one of strongest European clubs, ŽRK Budućnost Podgorica dominated in the history of competition, often playing seasons without any defeat. So, ŽRK Budućnost won five titles during the six seasons of WRHL.

Basketball

Men's competitions

Clubs from Montenegro have been playing in European basketball competitions since the 1980s. Until 2006, they represented SFR Yugoslavia and FR Yugoslavia. Almost all European seasons by Montenegrin clubs are played by KK Budućnost. Exceptions are a single-season parcitipations of KK Lovćen and KK Mornar in Europe. The most successful period was the end of the 1990s and the beginning of the new century. At that time, KK Budućnost played in the finish phases of EuroLeague. In that period, Budućnost often played games against greatest European basketball teams like FC Barcelona, Real Madrid, CSKA Moscow, Panathinaikos, Olympiacos, Maccabi Tel Aviv.

Today, Adriatic Basketball League is one of strongest in Europe. At 2001, one of founders was Montenegrin side KK Budućnost Podgorica, which is among most successful members of competition. Except Budućnost, in ABA League played three other clubs from Montenegro - KK Lovćen Cetinje, KK Sutjeska Nikšić and KK Mornar Bar. KK Budućnost played four times in the semifinal of ABA League playoffs, which is the most significant success of Montenegrin clubs in that competition until now.

Women's competitions

Women's basketball clubs from Montenegro participated in FIBA competitions since the start of century. Clubs that played in European Cups until today are ŽKK Budućnost Podgorica and ŽKK Jedinstvo Bijelo Polje. ŽKK Budućnost played in EuroLeague Women during the one season, but finished it after the group phase.

Women Adriatic Basketball League, or MŽRKL is founded at 2001, and Montenegrin clubs are part of it since 2004. Most successful Montenegrin representatives in WABA League were ŽKK Budućnost Podgorica and ŽKK Jedinstvo Bijelo Polje. While ŽKK Budućnost won champion title (2015–16), ŽKK Jedinstvo finished one season as a finalist in playoffs.

Volleyball

Men's competitions

Montenegrin volleyball clubs are participating in the CEV competitions since the season 1995–96. First team that ever competed at the European cups was OK Budućnost Podgorica. Except them, in CEV competitions played also OK Budvanska Rivijera Budva, OK Sutjeska Nikšić, OK Jedinstvo Bijelo Polje and OK Studentski Centar Podgorica. Among other competitions, OK Budućnost and OK Budvanska Rivijera played a numerous seasons in CEV Champions League, with few participations in the final phases of competition.

Women's competitions

Montenegrin women's volleyball clubs are participating in the CEV competitions since the season 1998–99. First team that ever competed at the European cups was ŽOK Luka Bar. Except them, in CEV competitions played also ŽOK Galeb Bar. Montenegrin women's volleyball teams played in Women's CEV Cup and CEV Women's Challenge Cup, and from the season 2016–17 in the qualifiers for CEV Women's Champions League.

National sports teams
From 2006, following Montenegrin independence, sports associations of Montenegro founded their own national sports teams. In the period 2006–2007, all sports associations became full members of international sports bodies, including the International Olympic Committee, so teams of Montenegro started with performances in official World and European competitions.

Notable results
Among the notable results and successes of Montenegrin national teams at the main competitions includes:

Montenegro national football team

Men

The Montenegro national football team represents Montenegro in association football and is controlled by the Fudbalski Savez Crne Gore (FSCG), the governing body for football in Montenegro. In October 2006, Montenegro was granted provisional membership of UEFA, with a full membership scheduled at a in January 2007. The team played its official friendly match against Hungary on 24 March 2007 in Podgorica, and won 2:1. Until now, best success of Montenegro was participation in the play-off round for UEFA Euro 2012. Montenegro played against the Czech Republic, but failing to qualify.

Women

Montenegro women's national football team was founded in 2012. It is organised and headed by Football Association of Montenegro. Montenegro played first official match on 13 March 2012 in Bar, against Bosnia and Herzegovina (2:3). Best competitive result, Montenegro made at 2013–14, when they qualified for the final round of 2015 FIFA Women's World Cup qualification (UEFA).

Montenegro national basketball team

Men

In 2006, the Basketball Federation of Montenegro along with national team joined the International Basketball Federation (FIBA) on its own following the Independence of Montenegro. The Montenegrin national team entered international competition in 2008, playing its first official match on September 6, against Netherlands in Almere (70–63). Montenegrin team participated on EuroBasket two times - 2011 and 2013.

Women

The women's national basketball team is the representative for Montenegro in international women's basketball competitions and it is organized and run by the Basketball Federation of Montenegro. The Montenegrin women's national team entered international competition in 2008, playing its first official match on August 27, against Republic of Ireland in Bijelo Polje (68–56). Montenegrin women's team participated on EuroBasket Women three times - 2011, 2013 and 2015, playing two times in quarterfinals.

Montenegro national handball team

Men

The national handball team was formed in 2006, recently after independence. Montenegro is a full member of IHF and EHF since 2006. Montenegro played their first official match at 3 January 2007 in Vantaa and won against Finland (28:26). Since then, Montenegro successfully qualified for four big competitions – once for the World Cup (2013) and for the European Championship 2008, 2014 and 2016.

Women

Montenegro women's national handball team was formed in 2006, and started playing in IHF and EHF competitions during the same year. Montenegro played their first official match in November 2006 in Cheb and won against Bulgaria (32:28). Women's handball team is among most successful national teams of Montenegro. They won Montenegro's first ever Olympic medal in 2012 by reaching the final. Same year, Montenegro was a champion of Europe.

Montenegro national volleyball team

Men

The national volleyball team was formed in 2006, recently after independence. Montenegro is a full member of FIVB and CEV since 2006. Montenegro played their first official match at 1 September 2007 in Podgorica and won against Latvia (3–1). Until now, at major tournaments, Montenegro played in FIVB World League and European League. The team never qualified for World Championship or European Championship. During the history, Montenegro won one gold medal at major men's volleyball tournaments.

Women

Soon after the Montenegrin independence referendum, Volleyball Federation of Montenegro founded national teams. Women's team started to play in 2008, with the first match against Albania (3:0, friendly game). Same year, Montenegro played its first games in official competitions - against Georgia in 2009 European Volleyball Championship qualifiers.

Montenegro national water polo team

See also 

 List of Montenegrin sportspeople

References